The California Horse Racing Board (CHRB) was established in 1933 as an independent agency of the State of California, United States. The CHRB has authority over the regulation of horse racing and parimutuel betting at licensed California race tracks. The function of the CHRB is to watch over authorized California horse races to protect the public from fraudulent operations. It is formally part of the Business, Consumer Services and Housing Agency.

The CHRB has seven members who are appointed by the Governor of California. The CHRB also acts as a liaison with other states' horse racing boards and help make possible off-track betting with other race tracks. The CHRB has committees which oversee the assorted duties of the Board. One of these is the steward's committee which acts on the complaints and concerns of the stewards.

CHRB Chairmen 
Keith Brackpool (2010)
John C. Harris (2009)
Richard B. Shapiro (2006 - 2008)
John C. Harris (2004 - 2005)
Roger Licht (2003)
Alan Landsburg (2002)
Robert H. Tourtelot (2000 - 2001)
George Nicholaw (1999)
Ralph M. Scurfield (1992 - 1998)

References

External links 
 
 California Horse Racing Board in the California Code of Regulations

Horse racing in California